David Horovitch (born 11 August 1945) is an English actor, perhaps best known for playing the character of Inspector Slack in Miss Marple. He appeared in the Game of Thrones prequel series House of the Dragon as Grand Maester Mellos.

Early life
Horovitch was born in London, the son of Alice Mary, a teacher, and Morris Horovitch, a child care worker. He was educated at St Christopher School, a boarding independent school in the town of Letchworth Garden City in Hertfordshire, followed by the Central School of Speech and Drama in London.

Horovitch's father was Jewish but atheist and married a non-Jew, and Horovitch was not brought up in the faith. He was in his 40s when he was given a string of Jewish roles and started learning about the religion.

Career
Horovitch has played many roles on popular British TV shows in the past 40 years including: Thriller, The New Avengers, Prince Regent, Piece of Cake, Bulman, Hold the Back Page, Boon, Love Hurts, Westbeach, Just William, Drop the Dead Donkey, Peak Practice, Foyle's War, The Second Coming, Deceit and Casualty as well as starring in the little-remembered ITV detective show Bognor.

In 1984 he played the role of Detective Inspector Slack for the first BBC Miss Marple adaptation, The Body in the Library. He returned for four Miss Marple Christmas specials (The Murder at the Vicarage, 4.50 from Paddington, They Do It With Mirrors and The Mirror Crack'd from Side to Side). In 1990 he played the role of Commander Daniels in Agatha Christie's Poirot The Kidnapped Prime Minister.

In 2022, he played Grand Maester Mellos in the Game of Thrones prequel series House of the Dragon.

He has also made a number of film appearances, including Sergeant Maskell in An Unsuitable Job for a Woman (1982), a French scientist in The Dirty Dozen: The Deadly Mission (1987), a Yiddish-speaking character in Solomon and Gaenor (1999), and Dr. Pavlov in Disney's 102 Dalmatians (2000).

In 2008, Horovitch guest-starred in the Sapphire and Steel audio drama Remember Me. He played Dr. Price in Mike Leigh's 2014 film Mr. Turner. In 2019 he played Corporal-Colonel Square in Dad's Army: The Lost Episodes, a recreation of three missing episodes of the BBC comedy Dad's Army.

Horovitch has also made numerous audiobooks, including the 2008 production of Jaroslav Hašek's The Good Soldier Švejk, Joseph Conrad's The Secret Agent, and the 2015 production of The Buried Giant by Kazuo Ishiguro.

Selected theatre performances
 Willum in The Nerd by Larry Shue. European premiere directed by Braham Murray at the Royal Exchange, Manchester (1982)
 Hope Against Hope adapted and directed by Casper Wrede at the Royal Exchange, Manchester (1983)
 Frink in The Act by Richard Langridge. Directed by Casper Wrede at the Royal Exchange, Manchester (1986)
 Torvald Helmer in A Doll's House by Henrik Ibsen. Directed by Greg Hersov at the Royal Exchange, Manchester (1987)
 Prospero in The Tempest. Directed by Braham Murray at the Royal Exchange, Manchester (1990)
 Dr Prentice in What the Butler Saw by Joe Orton. Directed by Robert Delamere at the Royal Exchange, Manchester (1994)
 Dr Gortler in I Have Been Here Before by J B Priestley. Directed by Marianne Elliott at the Royal Exchange, Manchester (1996)
 Josep Fenwick in An Experiment with an Airpump by Shelagh Stephenson. World premiere directed by Matthew Lloyd at the Royal Exchange, Manchester (1998)
 Pastor Manders in Ghosts by Henrik Ibsen. Directed by Braham Murray at the Royal Exchange, Manchester (2000)
 Major Barbara by George Bernard Shaw. Directed by Greg Hersov at the Royal Exchange, Manchester (Jun 2004)
George Frideric Handel in All the Angels by Nick Drake at the Sam Wanamaker Playhouse, London (2015)

References

External links
 

1945 births
Alumni of the Royal Central School of Speech and Drama
English male film actors
English male stage actors
English male television actors
Living people
People educated at St Christopher School, Letchworth
Male actors from London
20th-century English male actors
21st-century English male actors